Wilson Kindley Farm and Kindley Mine is a historic home, farm, gold mine, and national historic district located near Asheboro, Randolph County, North Carolina.  The Wilson Kindley House was built around 1873, and is a two-story, single-pile, three-bay, vernacular Greek Revival style brick dwelling.  It has a moderately pitched gable roof and overhanging eaves.  Other contributing resources are the well, wheathouse, the agricultural landscape, and the Kindley Mine, which was dug in the later quarter of the 19th century.

It was added to the National Register of Historic Places in 1992.

References

Farms on the National Register of Historic Places in North Carolina
Historic districts on the National Register of Historic Places in North Carolina
Greek Revival houses in North Carolina
Houses completed in 1873
Buildings and structures in Randolph County, North Carolina
National Register of Historic Places in Randolph County, North Carolina